MicroTiles are discontinued modular rear projection cube units designed, developed and marketed by Christie Digital. The building-block nature of the system made the configuration of the overall screen area and shape flexible. This allowed for simple traditional rectangular displays, and more complex non-standard shapes.

MicroTile units have sensors to detect whether there is another unit next to it, allowing the display controller to automatically determine the tile layout and the size and magnification of the video picture to be displayed across the screen area.

Launch 
The system was in development for two years before being launched. It was first publicly announced during an SEGD conference in New York on 11 November 2009. The official launch event was at the Touch nightclub in Manhattan, New York, on 9 December 2009.

The launch in Europe was at the ISE trade show in Amsterdam, 2–4 February 2010.

Following North America and Europe, the system was launched in Japan on 22 April 2010, and then throughout the rest of Asia throughout the following months.

System design 

The system was invented in 2005 by Christie Digital's Bob Rushby (CTO) and Mike Perkins (senior product developer) during discussions at a Tokyo hotel bar, during a business trip.

Color reproduction and resolution 
The system is capable of exceeding the NTSC specification for colour gamut by 115%. Because the LED light engine has a saturated color output, the image appears to be about 25% brighter than a similar lamp-based projector with the same lumen output. This is due to the Helmholtz–Kohlrausch effect. According to Mike Perkins, the subjective effect of this is that the purer colors from MicroTiles are punchier, more vivid, and more engaging.

Each tile is 16" × 12" (408 mm × 306 mm) and has a native resolution of 720 × 540 with a pixel pitch of 0.57 mm. The total resolution of the display can be a maximum of the sum of the native resolutions of each tile. Lower input resolutions are automatically up-scaled to fill the display area, which effectively increases the pixel pitch of the image displayed.

Self-configuring 
Each tile has microprocessor control to communicate with neighboring tiles to auto-adjust and balance both the color and brightness across all the tiles in the display. An electronic control unit (ECU) talks to each tile and creates an internal map of each tile position, and scales the video input across the whole display. This eliminates the need for calibrating the display manually.

Maintenance 
The servicing of a MicroTile unit in a display has also been a primary design consideration. Servicing is done from the front, and all major components, including the light engine, can be replaced in 15 minutes or less. This can be carried out without shutting down or dismantling the rest of the display. The LED light source is rated at 65,000 hours lifespan to 50% brightness. This is the equivalent of the system running continuously for 7 years.

Technical details

Projector engine 
The projector light engine is based on a Luminus Devices, Inc. PhatLight LED chipset and uses a TI DLP digital micromirror device. The short throw lens rear projects the image onto the removable tile screen.

Cabinet design 

The 10.2" (260 mm) depth tile chassis is equipped with precision fittings allowing tiles to be mated to each other side by side both horizontally and vertically, allowing displays of various shapes and sizes to be built. The screen is a matte-finished polycarbonate material mounted on a metal frame which is held onto the front of the tile cabinet magnetically. The frame is designed so that the seams visible in the picture between each tile in a screen array are kept to a minimum of about 1 mm. The power and signal connectors are on the rear of the cabinet, and once installed, there is no further need to access the rear panel for adjustments or maintenance. All mechanical maintenance is carried out from the front of the unit, with access gained by detaching the magnetically held screen with a suction grip tool.

Video input and control 
The video input to the system is via a DVI connector on the Electronic Control Unit (ECU), and it can accept video modes up to WUXGA (1920 × 1200). This is typically fed from a video processor or media player with a DVI interface as the video output. The ECU is also connected to the MicroTiles in a daisy chain or ring network using a customised version of the DisplayPort interface.

As well as carrying the video information, the DisplayPort links carry two way control and monitoring signalling between the tiles and the ECU. The ECU performs automatic calibration of light output and color control to ensure that the picture displayed is uniform across the array of tiles. MicroTiles displays can use multiple ECUs to allow higher resolution images to be displayed on large arrays. In this case one ECU arbitrates to become the master, and it assumes the role for device control; the other slave ECUs are just used for image signal processing.

The MicroTiles display system can be configured in shapes and sizes which don't conform to standard rectangular aspect ratio shapes and resolutions, and the number of pixels in the WUXGA video mode (about 2.3 million) is near the maximum that one ECU can display on a MicroTiles display. This allows resolutions to be displayed on smaller tile arrays at the native 0.57 mm pixel pitch (for up to six tiles)—larger arrays need more ECUs to be added to the system, which means that multiple media player outputs will be needed to drive the extra ECUs. If the highest quality native resolution display is not necessary, then lower resolution video inputs to the ECUs will be scaled across the display.

Built-in sensors in the cabinet top, bottom and sides allow the ECU to communicate with each tile and discover its neighbors, allowing it to map the array layout automatically. The ECU will then tell each tile what portion of the video input to display, so that an entire image is correctly formed and scaled across the whole display.

The ECU monitors the light output of the LED light sources in each tile and automatically adjusts the color and brightness of each tile to ensure the picture is uniform over the whole array.

Examples in use 
Since the product launch, the system has been used in some installations that can be seen by the public:
 In January 2010, the re-designed television set of the US show The Colbert Report contained four angled vertical columns of MicroTiles behind the presenter, and three horizontal displays around the floor.
 The NASCAR Hall of Fame opened in May 2010 in Charlotte, North Carolina, with a large display made up of 252 MicroTiles (a 14 ft × 18 ft "fan Billboard") flown from the roof in the Great Hall.
  The Christie MicroTile wall at the University of Waterloo Stratford Campus is three stories tall and made up of 150 individual MicroTiles.

See also 
 Digital Light Processing
 Comparison of display technology

References

External links 
 MicroTiles official website
 Christie Digital official website
 Christie Digital at Digital Signage Exposition (DSE) 2011
 Digital Display Screen

Television technology
Display technology